Periplomatidae is a family of large marine bivalves of the Anomalodesmata order.

Genera and species
 Albimanus Pilsbry & Olsson, 1935
 Cochlodesma Couthouy, 1839
 Halistrepta Dall, 1904  
Halistrepta sulcata (Dall, 1904) – sulcate spoonclam
 Offadesma Dall, 1904  
 Offadesma angasi (Crosse & Fischer, 1864)
 Pendaloma Iredale, 1930
 Periploma Schumacher, 1817 
Synonyms
 Aperiploma Habe, 1952: synonym of Cochlodesma Couthouy, 1839 
 Bontaea T. Brown, 1844: synonym of Cochlodesma Couthouy, 1839
 Galaxura Leach in Gray, 1852: synonym of Cochlodesma Couthouy, 1839
 Takashia Bernard, 1989: synonym of Pendaloma Iredale, 1930

References
 
 Powell A. W. B., New Zealand Mollusca, William Collins Publishers Ltd, Auckland, New Zealand 1979 
 Glen Pownall, New Zealand Shells and Shellfish, Seven Seas Publishing Pty Ltd, Wellington, New Zealand 1979 
 Valentich-Scott, P. & Coan E.V. (2010). "Three new species of Periploma (Bivalvia, Periplomatidae) from the Panamic Province." Zootaxa 2673 (2010): 65-68.
 Coan, E. V.; Valentich-Scott, P. (2012). Bivalve seashells of tropical West America. Marine bivalve mollusks from Baja California to northern Peru. 2 vols, 1258 pp

 
Bivalve families
Taxa named by William Healey Dall